(born October 13, 1983) is a South Korean actress and former member of Japanese bands Brandnew Biscuits and Memory Cats.

Filmography

TV series 
 여고시절 (SBS, 2002)
 Ucchan Nanchan no Urinari!! (NTV, 2002)
 Thousand Years of Love (SBS, 2003)
 Ballad of Seodong (SBS, 2005)
 Unstoppable Marriage (KBS2, 2007)
 My Fair Lady (KBS2, 2009)
 The Great Seer (SBS, 2012)

Film 
 Natu Odoru Ninja Densetsu (2000)
 Do Re Mi Fa So La Ti Do (2008)
 Just Friends (2010)

References

External links 
 Han Tae-youn at Cyworld
 
 

1983 births
Living people
South Korean pianists
South Korean women pianists
21st-century South Korean actresses
South Korean expatriates in Japan
21st-century South Korean singers
21st-century South Korean women singers
21st-century pianists
21st-century women pianists